Rosa Russo Iervolino (born Rosa Jervolino; born 17 September 1936) is an Italian politician.

Biography 

Iervolino was born to Angelo Raffaele Jervolino (1890–1985) and Maria De Unterrichter (1902–1975), a native of Trentino, on 17 September 1936. Her parents were both Christian Democracy parliamentarians. Her uncle was Südtiroler Volkspartei senator Guido De Unterrichter (1903–1979). She would go on to get a degree in law and begin practicing as a lawyer. The philosopher and politician Domenico Jervolino (1946–2018) was her cousin.

She married Vincenzo Russo on 26 October 1964. Aldo Moro was her witness. They had three children (Michele, Maria Cristina and Francesca). Her husband died before her fiftieth birthday. Her surname was later rendered as Iervolino (with an I instead of a J) and put beside her husband's surname.

Iervolino was leader of the Christian Democratic Women group from 1968 to 1978. She served as a member of the Italian Senate as a Christian Democrat (Democrazia Cristiana; DC), starting in 1979 as part of legislature VIII to 1994 in legislature XI when she resigned. She was elected for her first Senate term representing Lazio, but would represent Abruzzo for the remainder of her term as a Senator. She would also serve in the Chamber of Deputies for two terms, between 1994 and 2001.

She was the Minister of Public Education (1992–1994) and the first woman to become Minister of the Interior in Italy (1998–1999).

Following the dissolution of the DC, Iervolino joined the Italian People's Party (PPI) in 1994, and together with her fellow party members was a member of the Olive Tree coalition. She ran as a candidate for Mayor of Naples in the 2001 municipal election for the centre-left coalition and she won with 53% of votes. She would become the first female mayor of the city. On 29 May 2006, she was confirmed with over 57% of votes. She would subsequently go on to join the Democratic Party (PD).

Legal Issues 

In February 2013, Iervolino was charged by the Court of Audits, alongside other former mayors such as Antonio Bassolino. Each former mayor was charged 560,893 Euros due to wasting money on 'useless recruits.'

Electoral history

First-past-the-post elections

External links
 Mayoral candidacy website of Rosa Russo Iervolino
Italian Parliament Page

References 

1936 births
Living people
Mayors of Naples
Christian Democracy (Italy) politicians
Italian Ministers of the Interior
Education ministers of Italy
Women mayors of places in Italy
Democracy is Freedom – The Daisy politicians
Italian People's Party (1994) politicians
Women government ministers of Italy
21st-century Italian women politicians
20th-century Italian women politicians
Female interior ministers
Senators of Legislature XI of Italy
Senators of Legislature X of Italy
Senators of Legislature IX of Italy
Senators of Legislature VIII of Italy
Deputies of Legislature XII of Italy
Deputies of Legislature XIII of Italy
Women members of the Chamber of Deputies (Italy)
Women members of the Senate of the Republic (Italy)